Marc Pina (born 10 May 1961) is a South African cricketer. He played in three first-class matches for Boland from 1987/88 to 1990/91.

See also
 List of Boland representative cricketers

References

External links
 

1961 births
Living people
South African cricketers
Boland cricketers
Cricketers from Cape Town